Zatyshne is a village (a selo) in the Volnovakha Raion (district) of Donetsk Oblast in eastern Ukraine.

Demographics
Native language as of the Ukrainian Census of 2001:
 Ukrainian 54.23%
 Russian 45.77%

References

Villages in Volnovakha Raion